The Ministry of Kashmir Affairs & Gilgit-Baltistan (abbreviated as MoKGB) is a ministry of the Government of Pakistan. It handles the regional affairs of Azad Jammu and Kashmir and Gilgit-Baltistan as both territories of Pakistani-administered Kashmir do not have regular provincial status within Pakistan due to political circumstances revolving around the long-running Kashmir conflict.

History

1949–1974 
The Ministry of Kashmir Affairs (MKA) was first established in January 1949 following the First Indo-Pakistani War, which left Kashmir divided between India and Pakistan through a UNSC-mandated ceasefire line. Mushtaq Ahmad Gurmani, former diwan of Bahawalpur and Pakistani state minister without portfolio (sic) was appointed as the minister in charge of the MKA. A sprawling office was set up in Rawalpindi with a 300-man secretariat. The MKA also had directorates for public relations, refugee rehabilitation, movements and quartering, and civil supplies and coordination, which were located in the city of Murree.

In April 1949, the MKA executed the Azad Kashmir Karachi Agreement with the then President of Azad Kashmir, Muhammad Ibrahim Khan and the head of the All Jammu and Kashmir Muslim Conference, Chaudhry Ghulam Abbas. The document's terms gave complete control over the areas of Gilgit and Baltistan to the MKA. For the territory of Azad Jammu and Kashmir itself, control over defence and foreign affairs was ceded to the ministry, including the responsibilities of contemporary negotiations with the United Nations and any arrangements for the envisaged plebiscite for Kashmir. However, on the ground, the ministry had almost complete control over the Azad Jammu and Kashmir government, due to the latter's few resources and almost full dependence on Pakistan for supplies and management. 

Brookings Institution scholar Navnita C. Behera states:

Australian political scientist Christopher Snedden states:

Kashmiri political analyst Ershad Mahmud states:

1974–present
In 1974, under the Zulfikar Ali Bhutto administration, Azad Jammu and Kashmir's first constitution was drafted—known as the Interim Constitution of 1974. Under this ruling, Pakistan's controlled territory in Kashmir was politically bifurcated, with the regions comprising Gilgit and Baltistan being split into a separate unit called the Northern Areas. Likewise, the MKA was renamed to the Ministry of Kashmir Affairs and Northern Areas (MKANA).

In 2009, the Northern Areas were formally renamed to Gilgit-Baltistan, and the MKANA was correspondingly renamed to the Ministry of Kashmir Affairs and Gilgit-Baltistan (MoKGB).

Management divisions
 Jammu and Kashmir Refugees Rehabilitation Organization
 Northern Areas Transport Corporation
 Directorate of Health Service, AJK
 Directorate of Health Service, Gilgit-Baltistan
 Jammu and Kashmir State Property, Lahore

See also
 Ministry of States and Frontier Regions
 Azad Jammu and Kashmir Council
 Gilgit-Baltistan Council
Kashmir
Kashmir conflict

References

External links

Bibliography
 
 
 

Federal government ministries of Pakistan